Skuna is an unincorporated community in Calhoun County, Mississippi, United States.

History
The community takes its name from the Skuna River.

References

Unincorporated communities in Mississippi
Unincorporated communities in Calhoun County, Mississippi
Mississippi placenames of Native American origin